The Temple Institute, known in Hebrew as Machon HaMikdash, is an organization in Israel focusing on the endeavor of establishing the Third Temple. Its long-term aims are to build the third Jewish temple on the Temple Mount, on the site occupied by the Dome of the Rock, and to reinstate animal sacrificial worship. It aspires to reach this goal through the study of Temple construction and ritual and through the development of actual Temple ritual objects, garments, and building plans suitable for immediate use in the event conditions permit its reconstruction. It runs a museum in the Jewish Quarter of the Old City of Jerusalem in Israel. It was founded and is headed by Rabbi Yisrael Ariel. Its current director general is Dovid Shvartz, and the International Department is headed by Rabbi Chaim Richman. New York billionaire Henry Swieca has supported the institute. The Israeli government has also provided funding.

Activities

Building of Temple ritual items 

As part of its ongoing effort to prepare for a future rebuilt Temple, the Temple Institute has been preparing ritual objects suitable for Temple use. Many of the over ninety ritual items to be used in the Temple have been made by the Temple Institute.

As of June 2008, a major project of the institute was the creation of the sacred uniform of the Kohen Gadol, the High Priest, and the ordinary priests.  This project, the culmination of years of study and research, had already been underway for several years. The High Priest's Hoshen (breastplate) and Ephod have been completed. The Tzitz, the golden crown of the High Priest, was completed in 2007. The Temple Institute is designing the garments for the lay priests intended for purchase by  Kohanim.

Red heifer

In addition to a variety of items required for service within the Temple, the institute has attempted to locate a parah adumah (red heifer) consistent with the requirements of Numbers 19:1–22 and Mishnah Tractate Parah for purposes of taharah (purification) necessary to enter the Temple sanctuary proper in most circumstances. Previously, the institute identified two candidates, one in 1997 and another in 2002. The Temple Institute had initially declared both kosher, but later found each to be unsuitable. More recently in September of 2022, 5 perfect unblemished red heifers were brought to Israel from the USA and found to meet the qualifications after being inspected by rabbis. The heifers will be fed and cared for until the time that they can be slaughtered and used to created the necessary ashes for purification.

Controversies

Rebuilding a Jewish temple on the Temple Mount

Although Orthodox Judaism generally agrees that the Temple in Jerusalem will and should be rebuilt, there is a substantial disagreement about whether this should occur by human or divine hands. The Temple Institute interprets the opinion of the Rambam (Maimonides) as saying that Jews should attempt to build the Temple themselves, and have a mitzvah (obligation) to do so if they can. The Rambam's opinion, however, is a controversial one and has aroused substantial opposition.

The Temple Institute's view of the Rambam's opinion is not universally accepted by Maimonides scholars. According to seventeenth-century Rabbi Yom Tov Lipman Heller in his commentary on the tractate Yoma, the Rambam did not say that any Jew can build the future Temple, only the Messiah.

Ascending the Temple Mount

The rabbis associated with the Temple Institute hold (also following the Rambam) that it is, under certain conditions, permissible under Jewish law for Jews to visit parts of the Temple Mount and periodically organize groups to ascend and tour the Mount. The view that Jews may ascend the Temple is controversial among Orthodox rabbis, with many authorities completely prohibiting visiting the Mount to prevent accidental entrance into and desecration of the Holy of Holies or other sacred, off-limits areas.

The Temple Institute conducts aliyot (literally, "ascending"; "making a pilgrimage") to the Temple Mount. 
The institute claims that these aliyot are conducted in accordance with halachic requirements.

See also
 Modern attempts to revive the Sanhedrin

References and footnotes

External links

  The Temple Institute Official website

Orthodox Judaism
Zionist organizations
Religious Zionist organizations
Temple Mount
Tabernacle and Temples in Jerusalem
Museums in Jerusalem
Jewish messianism
Jewish museums
1987 establishments in Israel